In mathematics, the actuarial polynomials a(x) are polynomials studied by  given by the generating function

, .

See also

Umbral calculus

References

 Reprinted by Dover, 2005

Further reading 

Polynomials